An endangered language is a language that is at risk of falling out of use, generally because it has few surviving speakers. If it loses all of its native speakers, it becomes a dead language. A language may be endangered in one area but show signs of revitalisation in another, as with the Irish language.

The United Nations Educational, Scientific and Cultural Organization defines five levels of language endangerment between "safe" (not endangered) and "extinct":
 Vulnerable - "most children speak the language, but it may be restricted to certain domains (e.g., home)"
 Definitely endangered - "children no longer learn the language as mother tongue in the home"
 Severely endangered - "language is spoken by grandparents and older generations; while the parent generation may understand it, they do not speak it to children or among themselves"
 Critically endangered - "the youngest speakers are grandparents and older, and they speak the language partially and infrequently"
 Extinct - "there are no speakers left; included in the Atlas if presumably extinct since the 1950s"

The list below includes the findings from the third edition of Atlas of the World's Languages in Danger (2010; formerly the Red Book of Endangered Languages), as well as the online edition of the aforementioned publication, both published by UNESCO.

Afghanistan

Armenia

Azerbaijan

Bangladesh

Bhutan

Burma (Myanmar)

Cambodia

China

(Note: Taiwan area is not included in the list above. Related information is in section Taiwan.)

Cyprus

East Timor

Georgia

India

Indonesia

Iran

Iraq

Israel

Japan

Jordan

Kazakhstan

Korea

Kyrgyzstan

Laos

Lebanon

Malaysia

Mongolia

Nepal

Oman

Pakistan

Palestine

Philippines

Russia

Sri Lanka

Syria

Taiwan

Tajikistan

Thailand

Turkey

Turkmenistan

Uzbekistan

Vietnam

Yemen

Notes 

Asia
Endangered languages